The 58th Cannes Film Festival started on 11 May and ran until 22 May 2005. Twenty movies from 13 countries were selected to compete. The awards were announced on 21 May. The Palme d'Or went to the Belgian film L'Enfant by Dardenne brothers.

The festival opened with Lemming, directed by Dominik Moll and closed with Chromophobia, directed by Martha Fiennes. Cécile de France was the mistress of ceremonies.

Juries

Main competition
The following people were appointed as the Jury for the feature films of the 2005 Official Selection:
 Emir Kusturica (director) Jury President
 Javier Bardem (actor)
 Fatih Akın (director)
 Nandita Das (actress)
 Salma Hayek (actress)
 Toni Morrison (author)
 Benoît Jacquot (director)
 Agnès Varda (director)
 John Woo (director)

Un Certain Regard
The following people were appointed as the Jury of the 2005 Un Certain Regard:
Alexander Payne (director, screenwriter) (USA) President
Betsy Blair (actress) (USA)
Eduardo Antin (critic, author) (Argentina)
Geneviève Welcomme (journalist) (France)
Gilles Marchand (director, screenwriter) (France)
Katia Chapoutier (journalist) (Canada)
Sandra Den Hamer (director of the Rotterdam Festival) (Netherlands)

Cinéfondation and short films
The following people were appointed as the Jury of the Cinéfondation and short films competition:
Edward Yang (director) (Taïwan) President
Chantal Akerman (director) (Belgium)
Colin MacCabe (critic, author) (Ireland)
Sylvie Testud (actress) (France)
Yousry Nasrallah (director) (Egypt)

Camera d'Or
The following people were appointed as the Jury of the 2005 Camera d'Or:
Abbas Kiarostami (director) (Iran) President
Laura Meyer (cinephile) (France)
Luc Pourrinet (technician) (France)
Malik Chibane (director) (France)
Patrick Chamoiseau (writer) (France)
Roberto Turigliatto (Festival of Turin) (Italy)
Romain Winding (cinematographer) (France)
Scott Foundas (critic) (USA)
Yves Allion (critic) (France)

Official selection

In competition - Feature film
The following feature films competed for the Palme d'Or: The Palme d'Or winner has been highlighted.

Un Certain Regard
The following films were selected for the competition of Un Certain Regard:

 Blood (Sangre) by Amat Escalante
 The Bow by Kim Ki-duk
 Cinema, Aspirins and Vultures by Marcelo Gomes
 Dark Horse by Dagur Kári
 The Death of Mr. Lazarescu by Cristi Puiu
 Delwende by S. Pierre Yameogo
 Down in the Valley by David Jacobson
 Le filmeur by Alain Cavalier
 The Forsaken Land by Vimukthi Jayasundara
 Havana Blues by Benito Zambrano
 I Am Guilty by Christoph Hochhäusler
 Jewboy by Tony Krawitz
 Johanna by Kornél Mundruczó
 The King by James Marsh
 Lower City (Cidade Baixa) by Sérgio Machado
 Marock by Laïla Marrakchi
 Northeast by Juan Diego Solanas
 My God, My God, Why Hast Thou Forsaken Me? by Shinji Aoyama
 One Night by Niki Karimi
 Sleeper by Benjamin Heisenberg
 Time to Leave by François Ozon
 Yellow Fella by Ivan Sen
 Zim and Co. by Pierre Jolivet

Films out of competition
The following films were selected to be screened out of competition:

 Avenge But One of My Two Eyes by Avi Mograbi
 C'est pas tout à fait la vie dont j'avais rêvé by Michel Piccoli
 Chromophobia by Martha Fiennes
 Cindy: The Doll Is Mine by Bertrand Bonello
 Crossing the Bridge: The Sound of Istanbul by Fatih Akın
 Dalkomhan insaeng by Kim Jee-woon
 Darshan - L'étreinte by Jan Kounen
 Joyeux Noël by Christian Carion
 Kirikou and the Wild Beasts by Michel Ocelot and Bénédicte Galup
 Kiss Kiss Bang Bang by Shane Black
 The Burnt Theatre by Rithy Panh
 Match Point by Woody Allen
 Midnight Movies: From the Margin to the Mainstream by Stuart Samuels
 Operetta tanuki goten by Seijun Suzuki
 Star Wars: Episode III – Revenge of the Sith by George Lucas
 The Power of Nightmares by Adam Curtis

Cinéfondation
The following short films were selected for the competition of Cinéfondation:

 Vdvoyom (A deux) by Nikolay Khomeriki (France)
 A Song for Rebecca by Norah McGettigan (Poland)
 Badgered by Sharon Colman (United Kingdom)
 Bikur Holim by Maya Dreifuss (Israel)
 Buy It Now by Antonio Campos (United States)
 El espino by Théo Court Bustamante (Cuba)
 En la oscuridad by Juan Manuel Rampoldi, Marcelo Charras (Argentina)
 Exit (2004 film) by Robert Depuis (Denmark)
 Five O' Clock Shadow by Malcolm Lamont (United States)
 La cerca by Rubén Mendoza (Colombia)
 La plaine by Roland Edzard (France)
 Le violon by Heng Yang (China)
 Slavek The Shit by Grímur Hákonarson (Iceland, Czech Republic)
 Conscience (film) (Svedomí) by Jan Bohuslav (Czech Republic)
 Tiens toi tranquille by Sameh Zoabi (France)
 Vanilla Song by Jakob Rørvik (United Kingdom)
 Walk On a Little More by Min-young Shim (South Korea)

Short film competition
The following short films competed for the Short Film Palme d'Or:

 Baby Shark (Bébé requin) by Pascal-Alex Vincent
 Before Dawn by Bálint Kenyeres
 Clara by Van Sowerwine
 Disparue by Kit Hui
 Kitchen by Alice Winocour
 L'homme qui s'est rencontre by Ben Crowe
 Nothing Special by Helena Brooks
 Sous la lueur de la lune by Peter Ghesquiere
 Wayfarers (Podorozhni) by Igor Strembitskyy

Cannes Classics
Tribute

49th Parallel by Michael Powell (1941)
A Matter of Life and Death by Michael Powell, Emeric Pressburger (1946)
Black Narcissus by Michael Powell, Emeric Pressburger (1947)
I Know Where I'm Going! by Michael Powell, Emeric Pressburger (1945)
The Pearl (La perla) by Emilio "Indio" Fernández (1947)
Los Olvidados by Luis Buñuel (1950)
Salón México (Mexico Lounge) by Emilio "Indio" Fernández (1949)
The Edge of the World by Michael Powell (1937)

Documentaries about Cinema

Al'Lèèssi... une actrice Africaine by Rahmatou Keita
Ingmar Bergman Complete: Bergman and the Cinema / Bergman and the Theatre / Bergman and Fårö Island by Marie Nyreröd (2004)
James Dean: Forever Young by Michael J. Sheridan
John Cassavetes by André S. Labarthe
Kitano Takeshi Shinshutsu-Kibotsu by Jean-Pierre Limosin
Moments choisis des histoire(s) du cinema by Jean-Luc Godard 
Shadowing the Third Man by Frederick Baker

Restored prints

An Airman's Letter to His Mother by Michael Powell (1941 Short)
Notes Towards an African Orestes (Appunti per un'Orestiade Africana) by Pier Paolo Pasolini (1975)
Beyond the Rocks by Sam Wood (1922 / 2005)
Bullitt by Peter Yates (1968)
There Was a Father (Chichi ariki) by Yasujirō Ozu (1942)
East of Eden by Elia Kazan (1955)
La Fille de l'eau (Whirlpool of Fate) by Jean Renoir (1925)
The Fire Within (Le feu follet) by Louis Malle (1963)
Angels of Sin (Les anges du péché) by Robert Bresson (1943)
Pather Panchali by Satyajit Ray (1955)
Pele Eterno by Anibal Massaini Neto (2004)
Rebel Without a Cause by Nicholas Ray (1955)
King Boxer (Tian xia di yi quan) by Chang-Wah Chung (1973)
Two-Lane Blacktop by Monte Hellman (1971)

Parallel sections

International Critics' Week
The following films were screened for the 44th International Critics' Week (44e Semaine de la Critique):

Feature film competition

 The Great Ecstasy of Robert Carmichael by Thomas Clay (United Kingdom)
 The Horizon of Events (L’orizzonte degli eventi) by Daniele Vicari (Italy)
 Little Jerusalem (La petite Jérusalem) by Karin Albou (France)
 Me and You and Everyone We Know by Miranda July (United States)
 A Stranger of Mine (Unmei Janai Hito) by Kenji Uchida (Japan)
 Grain in Ear (Máng zhòng) by Zhang Lu (China, South Korea)
 Orlando Vargas by Juan Pittaluga (Uruguay, France)

Short film competition

 Le grand vent by Valérie Liénardy (Belgium)
 Respire by Wi Ding Ho (Taiwan)
 Mirror Mechanics by Siegfried A. Fruhauf (Austria)
 Blue Tongue by Justin Kurzel (Australia)
 Imago... by Cédric Babouche (France)
 Get the Rabbit Back by Dimitar Mitovski & Kamen Kalev (Bulgaria)
 Jona/Tomberry by Rosto (Netherlands)

Directors' Fortnight
The following films were screened for the 2005 Directors' Fortnight (Quinzaine des Réalizateurs):

 

 Alice by Marco Martins (Portugal)
 Be with Me by Eric Khoo (Singapore)
 Cache-cache by Yves Caumon (France)
 Family Diary (Cronaca familiare) by Valerio Zurlini (1962)
 Crying Fist by Ryoo Seung-wan (South Korea)
 Douches froides by Antony Cordier (France)
 Factotum by Bent Hamer (Norway, United States, Germany, France)
 Géminis by Albertina Carri (Argentina, France)
 Guernsey by Nanouk Leopold (Netherlands, Belgium)
 Iron Island (Jazireh Ahani) by Mohammad Rasoulof (Iran)
 Keane by Lodge Kerrigan (United States)
 The Buried Forest (Umoregi) by Kohei Oguri (Japan)
 La Moustache by Emmanuel Carrère (France)
 Odete by João Pedro Rodrigues (Portugal)
 Ride the High Country by Sam Peckinpah (1962)
 Room by Kyle Henry (United States)
 Seven Invisible Men by Šarūnas Bartas (Portugal, France, Lithuania)
 Sisters In Law by Kim Longinotto, Florence Ayisi (United Kingdom, Cameroon)
 Tbilisi-Tbilisi by Levan Zakareishvili (Georgia)
 The President's Last Bang by Im Sang-soo (South Korea)
 Travaux, on sait quand ça commence... by Brigitte Roüan (France)
 Who’s Camus Anyway? by Mitsuo Yanagimachi (Japan)
 Wolf Creek by Greg McLean (Australia)

Short films

 À bras le corps by Katell Quillévéré (19 min.)
 À mains nues by Agnès Feuvre (26 min.)
 Consultation Room by Kei Oyama (9 min.)
 Cosmetic Emergency by Martha Colburn (9 min.)
 Da Janela Do Meu Quarto by Cao Guimarães (5 min.)
 Du soleil en hiver by Samuel Collardey (17 min.)
 Etoile violette by Axelle Ropert (45 min.)
 Instructions for a Light and Sound Machine by Peter Tscherkassky (17 min.)
 Kara, Anak Sebatang Pohon by Edwin (9 min.)
 Majorettes by Lola Doillon (16 min.)
 Nits by Harry Wootliff (11 min.)
 Résfilm by Sándor Kardos (19 min.)
 The Buried Forest by Kohei Oguri (1h33 
 Trilogy About Clouds by Naoyuki Tsuji (14 min.)
 Vinil verde by Kleber Mendonça Filho (17 min.)

Awards

Official awards
The following films and people received the 2005 Official selection awards:
 Palme d'Or: L'Enfant, by Jean-Pierre Dardenne and Luc Dardenne
 Grand Prix: Broken Flowers, by Jim Jarmusch
 Best Director Award: Caché by Michael Haneke
 Best Screenplay Award: Guillermo Arriaga for The Three Burials of Melquiades Estrada
 Best Actress: Hanna Laslo in Free Zone
 Best Actor: Tommy Lee Jones in The Three Burials of Melquiades Estrada
 Prix du Jury: Shanghai Dreams, by Wang Xiaoshuai
Un Certain Regard
 Prix Un Certain Regard: The Death of Mr. Lăzărescu by Cristi Puiu
 Un Certain Regard Prix de l'intimité: Le filmeur by Alain Cavalier
 Un Certain Regard Prix de l'espoir: Delwende by S. Pierre Yameogo
Cinéfondation
 First Prize: Buy It Now by Antonio Campos
 Second Prize: Bikur Holim by Maya Dreifuss & Vdvoyom (A deux) by Nikolay Khomeriki
 Third Prize: La plaine by Roland Edzard & Tiens toi tranquille by Sameh Zoabi
Golden Camera
 Caméra d'Or: The Forsaken Land by Vimukthi Jayasundara & Me and You and Everyone We Know by Miranda July
Short films
 Short Film Palme d'Or: Wayfarers (Podorozhni) by Igor Strembitskyy
 Special Mention: Clara by Van Sowerwine

Independent awards
FIPRESCI Prizes
 Hidden by Michael Haneke (In competition)
 Crying Fist by Ryoo Seung-wan (Directors' Fortnight)
 Blood (Sangre) by Amat Escalante (Un Certain Regard)
Vulcan Award of the Technical Artist
 Vulcan Award: 
 Leslie Shatz for Sound design in Last Days
 Robert Rodriguez for Visual processing in Sin City
Ecumenical Jury
 Prize of the Ecumenical Jury: Hidden (Caché) by Michael Haneke
 Ecumenical Jury - Special mention: Delwende by S. Pierre Yameogo
Award of the Youth
 Lower City (Cidade Baixa) by Sérgio Machado
Awards in the frame of International Critics' Week
 Grand prix: Me and You and Everyone We Know by Miranda July
 Prix ACID: Grain in Ear (Mang zong) by Zhang Lu
 Grand Prix Canal+ (short film): Jona/Tomberry de Rosto
Awards in the frame of Directors' Fortnight
 3ème Label Europa Cinéma : La Moustache by Emmanuel Carrère
 Prix Art & Essai CICAE : Sisters In Law by Kim Longinotto, Florence Ayisi
 3ème Prix Regards Jeunes : Alice by Marco Martins
 Prix SACD du court métrage : Du soleil en hiver by Samuel Collardey
 Prix Gras Savoye : À bras le corps by Katell Quillévéré
Association Prix François Chalais
 Prix François Chalais: Once You're Born You Can No Longer Hide, by Marco Tullio Giordana

References

Media
INA: Opening of the 2005 Festival (commentary in French)
INA: List of winners of the 2005 Festival (commentary in French)

External links

2005 Cannes Film Festival (web.archive)
Official website Retrospective 2005 
Cannes Film Festival Awards for 2005 at Internet Movie Database

Cannes Film Festival
Cannes Film Festival
Cannes Film Festival
Cannes Film Festival
Cannes Film Festival
Cannes Film Festival